Mott/Regent Public School District 1 is a school district with a single K-12 campus in Mott, North Dakota.  enrollment is about 242.

Mostly in Hettinger County, it serves Mott and Regent. It also has sections in Adams and Stark counties.

The Mott/Regent School District's mascot is the Wildfire.

History
The district was formerly in a North Dakota school construction loan program, but was pushed out by 2014 because it used all of the funds within a several month span that were intended for a two year period. Therefore the district was planning a school bond. The intended cost of the new school was at or below $14,900,000. The intended campus location, in the midpoint from the fairgrounds to the city limits, was to have a capacity of about 300. The district wanted the bond to be for $14,500,000. In May 2014 voters rejected two measures related to the school bond, with 63% opposing an increase of the debt levy and 60% against the levying of a bond itself. There were 838 voters, which Bill Gion, the president of the Mott-Regent school board, called "great turnout", and he concluded "The patrons have spoken, (there's) more work to do."

Athletics
The Mott/Regent Wildfire won the 2007 North Dakota High School Nine Man Football championship, defeating the Napoleon-Gackle-Streeter Imperials.

In 2017 it started a cooperative American football team with the New England School District.

References

External links
 Mott/Regent School District
School districts in North Dakota
Education in Adams County, North Dakota
Hettinger County, North Dakota
Education in Stark County, North Dakota